Sibabalwe Gladwin Mzazi (born 28 August 1988) is a South African athlete competing in the long-distance running events. He competed at five consecutive Summer Universiades winning gold medals in 2009 and 2013.

Competition record

Personal bests
3000 metres – 7:50.90 (Metz 2011)
5000 metres – 13:24.50 (Stellenbosch 2012)
10,000 metres – 27:56.9 (Stellenbosch)
10 kilometres – 28:22 (Cape Town 2014)
20 kilometres – 58:41 (Prague 2014)
Half marathon – 1:01:12 (New Delhi 2013)
Marathon – 2:17:43 (Fukuoka 2014)

References

1988 births
Living people
South African male long-distance runners
South African male marathon runners
Athletes (track and field) at the 2016 Summer Olympics
Olympic athletes of South Africa
Universiade medalists in athletics (track and field)
Tshwane University of Technology alumni
Universiade gold medalists for South Africa
Competitors at the 2007 Summer Universiade
Medalists at the 2009 Summer Universiade
Competitors at the 2011 Summer Universiade
Medalists at the 2013 Summer Universiade
Competitors at the 2015 Summer Universiade
21st-century South African people